Trivia candidula is a species of small sea snail, a marine gastropod mollusc in the family Triviidae, the false cowries or trivias.

Description

Distribution
This species occurs in the Mediterranean Sea, in the North Atlantic Ocean (Azores, Cape Verdes, Canary Islands), off West Africa, off Angola; in the Caribbean Sea.

References

 Gofas, S.; Le Renard, J.; Bouchet, P. (2001). Mollusca, in: Costello, M.J. et al. (Ed.) (2001). European register of marine species: a check-list of the marine species in Europe and a bibliography of guides to their identification. Collection Patrimoines Naturels, 50: pp. 180–213

Triviidae
Gastropods described in 1836
Molluscs of the Atlantic Ocean
Molluscs of the Mediterranean Sea
Molluscs of Macaronesia
Molluscs of Angola
Gastropods of Cape Verde